Paradise Lost is a 1940 French war drama film directed by Abel Gance and starring Fernand Gravey, Elvire Popesco and Micheline Presle. In pre-First World War Paris, an aspiring artist falls in love with a dressmaker. After she dies in childbirth he volunteers to take part in a dangerous mission during the war. Badly wounded, he nonetheless recovers, and returns home to bring up his only daughter.

Cast
 Fernand Gravey as Le peintre Pierre Leblanc 
 Elvire Popesco as Sonia Vorochine 
 Micheline Presle as Janine Mercier / Jeannette Leblanc 
 André Alerme as le couturier Raoul Calou 
 Monique Rolland as Laurence Aubujan 
 Robert Le Vigan as Édouard Bordenave 
 Robert Pizani as Le couturier Bernard Lesage 
 Jane Marken as Madame Bonneron – la concierge 
 Marcel Delaître as Le capitaine 
 Les Bluebell Girls as Les girls à l'inauguration de la Marie-Galante 
 Gérard Landry as Gérard Aubujan

References

Bibliography 
 Dayna Oscherwitz & MaryEllen Higgins. The A to Z of French Cinema. Scarecrow Press, 2009.

External links 
 

1940 films
1940s war drama films
French war drama films
1940s French-language films
Films directed by Abel Gance
Films set in the 1910s
French historical drama films
1940s historical drama films
French World War I films
Films set in Paris
French black-and-white films
1940s French films